Kiril Parlichev (1 March 1875 – 9 February 1944) was a Bulgarian revolutionary and public figure. He was a member of Internal Macedono-Adrianopolean Revolutionary Organization (IMARO) and a popular teacher, journalist, translator and writer.

Biography
Parlichev was born in Ohrid, Ottoman Empire in 1875. His father was Grigor Parlichev - a popular Bulgarian educator.

On 5 August 1898 Dimitar Grdanov, a Serbian teacher in Ohrid, and pro-Serbian activist in Macedonia was murdered by Metody Patchev, after which Patchev and his fellow conspirators Hristo Uzunov, Parlichev and Ivan Grupchev were arrested.

Parlichev later taught in the Bulgarian Men's High School of Thessaloniki, where he was accepted in IMARO. During the Ilinden-Preobrazhenie Uprising he was a member of the Hristo Chernopeev's band. After the end of the unsuccessful uprising, he started studying history in Sofia University. In the meantime he worked as a secretary of the IMARO committee in Sofia.

After the Young Turk Revolution, Parlichev participated in the inauguration of the Bulgarian Constitutional Clubs political party. He taught in Edessa, where he and Hristo Zaneshev contributed to the activity of Bulgarian Constitutional Clubs.

In 1918 Parlichev wrote his first work - The Serbian Regime and the Revolutionary Struggle in Macedonia (in ). He was also one of the founders of the Macedonian Scientific Institute in 1923. Parlichev translated into Bulgarian works of Karl Marx, Voltaire and others. After the murder of Todor Alexandrov, Parlichev was forced by Ivan Mihailov to stop his participation in the activities of IMRO. In the period 1941-1944, when the area was under Bulgarian control, he was director of the Historical Museum in Ohrid. He died there on 9 February 1944. Parlichev is survived today by his grandson, Kiril, who has published his previously unknown works in Sofia, Bulgaria.

Works
 The Serbian Regime and the Revolutionary Struggle in Macedonia (1912 - 1915)
 Kyustendil Congress of IMRO from 1908. VEDA-MZH, Sofia 2001 (in 
 36 Years in the IMRO - Memories of Kiril Parlichev. VEDA-MZH, Sofia 2001. (in 
 Towards a Characterization of Grigor S. Parlichev, Macedonian Review 4 (2), pp. 99 - 140 (1928)

Sources
 Cveta Trifonova, Danail Krapchev and the newspaper Zora (in Bulgarian)
 The Grandson of Our Famous Revolutionary Grigor Parlichev - Kiril Parlichev, (in Bulgarian)
 Toma Nikolov, Some Words For Kiril Parlichev, (in Bulgarian)

References 

1875 births
1944 deaths
People from Ohrid
People from Manastir vilayet
Members of the Internal Macedonian Revolutionary Organization
Bulgarian translators
Bulgarian educators
Members of the Macedonian Scientific Institute
Bulgarian revolutionaries
Bulgarian people imprisoned abroad
Prisoners and detainees of the Ottoman Empire
Macedonian Bulgarians
Bulgarian Men's High School of Thessaloniki alumni
20th-century translators